The Thorpe Interchange is a large motorway free-flow intersection in Surrey, United Kingdom, connecting the M3 with the M25.

History

M3
The section of the M3 that passes through the interchange (Bagshot A322 to Sunbury Cross A308, junctions 1–3) opened on 11 July 1974. The A316 from Sunbury Cross (eastwards) was improved at the same time. It was the last of four contracts of the first main section of the M3. Construction of this section of the M3 had begun in January 1971. The £12.7m contract was awarded to A.E. Farr of Westbury, Wiltshire. The section involved building fifty bridges.

M25
The section of the M25 to the north began in August 1974 and opened in December 1976. The section of the M25 to the south (Chertsey to Thorpe) began in July 1978 and opened on 9 October 1980.

The M25 north of here to the junction with the M4 junction 15, is one of the busiest roads in the UK. The M25 reached the M4 from the M3 in 1985.

Construction
Construction of the full interchange began in July 1978 and it opened in 1980.

Structure
The junction is junction 2 of the M3, and junction 12 of the M25. The M25 north of the junction is 5 lanes, and south of the junction it is 4 lanes wide. The next junction north along the M25 is the Addlestone Interchange, and south along the M25 is the Runnymede Interchange. The design is a turbine interchange. The B389 (west) and B388 (east) pass east–west close to the north of the interchange. Chertsey is around one mile to the south-east. The Chertsey Branch Line passes close to the south-west, between Virginia Water railway station (to the west), and Chertsey railway station (to the south-east).

References

External links
 Sabre
 A-Z blog
 Motorway Archive

Buildings and structures in Surrey
M25 motorway
Motorway junctions in England
Roads in Surrey
Borough of Runnymede
Transport infrastructure completed in 1980